Joaquín Alonso González (born 9 June 1956), known simply as Joaquín, is a Spanish former footballer who played as an attacking midfielder.

Club career
Joaquín was born in Oviedo, Asturias. During his 16-year professional career, he played solely for Sporting de Gijón even though he was born in the city of neighbouring Real Oviedo. After 17 appearances and one goal in his debut season in La Liga he became an undisputed starter, going on to take part in a further 462 top-division games until June 1992 (644 overall), with a total of 65 goals.

In the 1986–87 campaign, as the team finished fourth, Joaquín scored eight times in 40 matches (third-best in the squad). He continued to feature prominently until the end of his career, retiring at the age of 36 with the most games played in the Spanish top flight, a record which stood for less than one year, however.

International career
Joaquín earned 18 caps and scored once for Spain, and was selected to the 1982 FIFA World Cup squad. His debut came on 14 November 1979 in a 1–3 friendly defeat against Denmark, in Cádiz.

In 1996, Joaquín began playing beach soccer for the Spanish national team. In January 2002 he was appointed their head coach, and stayed in the role for 17 years until he stepped down in November 2019.

Joaquín also served on the technical staff of the women's national team in the same sport.

International goals

See also
List of one-club men in association football
List of La Liga players (400+ appearances)
List of Sporting de Gijón players (100+ appearances)

References

External links

1956 births
Living people
Spanish footballers
Footballers from Oviedo
Association football midfielders
La Liga players
Segunda División players
Sporting de Gijón B players
Sporting de Gijón players
Spain under-21 international footballers
Spain under-23 international footballers
Spain amateur international footballers
Spain international footballers
1982 FIFA World Cup players
Olympic footballers of Spain
Footballers at the 1980 Summer Olympics
Spanish beach soccer players